Brita Sigourney (born January 17, 1990) is an American freestyle skier.

Career
She attended Santa Catalina School in Monterey, California, and later went on to attend the University of California, Davis, where she played water polo. She trained in her career as a freestyle skier in Park City, Utah. She won a silver medal in the superpipe at Winter X Games XV in 2011, followed by a bronze in 2012. She has competed in both the 2014 and 2018 Winter Olympics, finishing 6th in 2014. She won a bronze medal in the 2018 Olympics on February 19, 2018, with a score of 91.6, which she achieved on her third run. Until her third run, the judges expressed to an NBC broadcaster their approval of her form and amplitude but that she needed improvement with her creativity. She was good friends with her competitor Annalisa Drew and regretted bumping her off the podium. She won another bronze at the 2019 FIS World Championship in halfpipe.

References

External links
  (archive)
 
 
 
 

Living people
American female freestyle skiers
1990 births
Freestyle skiers at the 2014 Winter Olympics
Freestyle skiers at the 2018 Winter Olympics
Freestyle skiers at the 2022 Winter Olympics
Olympic freestyle skiers of the United States
University of California, Davis alumni
X Games athletes
People from Carmel-by-the-Sea, California
Olympic bronze medalists for the United States in freestyle skiing
Medalists at the 2018 Winter Olympics
Sportspeople from Monterey, California
21st-century American women